Stephen Asa Northway (June 19, 1833 – September 8, 1898) was an American lawyer and politician who served as a U.S. Representative from Ohio from 1893 to 1898.

Early life

Born in Christian Hollow, New York, Northway moved with his parents in 1840 to the township of Orwell, Ohio.
He attended the district school, Kingsville Academy, and Orwell Academy.
He taught school.
He studied law.

Career
He was admitted to the bar in 1859 and commenced practice in Jefferson, Ohio.
He served as prosecuting attorney of Ashtabula County 1861-1865.
He served as member of the State house of representatives in 1865 and 1866.
He resumed the practice of law.

Later life and death
Northway was elected as a Republican to the Fifty-third, Fifty-fourth, and Fifty-fifth Congresses and served from March 4, 1893, until his death in Jefferson, Ohio, on September 8, 1898.
He was interred in Oakdale Cemetery.

See also

List of United States Congress members who died in office (1790–1899)

Sources

1833 births
1898 deaths
People from Orwell, Ohio
Ohio lawyers
Republican Party members of the Ohio House of Representatives
County district attorneys in Ohio
19th-century American politicians
People from Jefferson, Ohio
19th-century American lawyers
Republican Party members of the United States House of Representatives from Ohio